Jesús Herrera (born March 22, 1962) is a retired long-distance runner from Mexico.

Career

He represented his native country at two consecutive Summer Olympics, starting in 1984. His best Olympic result was finishing in 11th place in the men's marathon, clocking 2:13:58, at the 1988 Summer Olympics in Seoul, South Korea.

Achievements

References

1962 births
Living people
Mexican male long-distance runners
Mexican male steeplechase runners
Olympic athletes of Mexico
Athletes (track and field) at the 1984 Summer Olympics
Athletes (track and field) at the 1987 Pan American Games
Athletes (track and field) at the 1988 Summer Olympics
Universiade medalists in athletics (track and field)
Universiade silver medalists for Mexico
Pan American Games competitors for Mexico
20th-century Mexican people
21st-century Mexican people